The Battle of Beaugency was a battle of the Franco-Prussian War contested between the army group of the Grand Duke of Mecklenburg, and the French Armée de la Loire, won by the Prussians. It lasted from 8 to 10 December 1870 and occurred on the left bank of the river Loire to the northwest of the town of Beaugency.  Due to the large area over which it was fought, it is also known as the Battle of Beaugency-Cravant or the Battle of Villorceau-Josnes.

Context

Sharing the Army of the Loire at Orléans
The Army of the Loire had been split subsequent to the retreat of General Aurelle after the Battle of Loigny.  French political leader Gambetta 'retired' Aurelle and appointed two generals to lead the now split armies.  General Antoine Chanzy commanded the two corps north of the Loire (XVI and XVII) while General Bourbaki commanded south of the river (XV, XVIII and XX corps).

Beaugency until 8 December
From his headquarters at Chateau de Talcy Chazny grouped three divisions in defensive positions at Beaugency to make a stand with the Loire river on his right flank and his left in the forest of Marchenoir. Continual rain and snow coupled with flagging morale and disorganization he could do little else.

Course
During the 8th and 9th fierce fighting occurred between the Germans and French. Both sides fought for the key positions of the walled villages of Cravant and Beumont. The French had superiority of numbers (~100,000) and effective artillery fire forced the Germans (Mecklenburg) to break contact. Cold, exhaustion and deprivations plagued the Germans as well as the French during this time.

Moltke ordered Mecklenburg reinforced by Prince Freiderich Karl to destroy the French forces under Chanzy. Chanzy's only hope was assistance from Bourbaki's 150,000 troops south of the Loire. Bourbaki attempted to order his dispirited troops into action, but they refused his order.  After visiting Bourbaki Gambetta stated that it "was the saddest sight he had ever seen," the army was "in veritable dissolution."

10 December
Chazny had to break contact and retreat from the Loire toward Le Mans once German reinforcements arrived.

Notes

Sources
 Compton's Home Library: Battles of the World
 Friedrich Engels: On the War, The Pall Mall Gazette Nr. 1824 of 17 December 1870
Amtspresse Preußen

External links
 Orléans, in: Meyers Konversationslexikon, Vol 12. p 444 f
 Beaugency, in Meyers Konversationslexikon, Vol 2 p 574
 http://www.preussenweb.de Preußen-Seite
 http://www.loire1870.fr/

Battle of Beaugency
Conflicts in 1870
Battles of the Franco-Prussian War
Battles involving Prussia
Beaugency 1870
History of Loiret
December 1870 events